Voyage to the City of the Dead (1984) is a science fiction novel  by American writer Alan Dean Foster.

Plot
Scientists Eitienne and Lyra Redowl come to the planet Horseye to study the entire length of the immense Skar River and its spectacular river chasm, the largest in the whole Humanx Commonwealth. On Horseye there are three separate sentient species, which all have different concerns about their planet. The Mai, traders from the river delta, are prepared to help the Redowls, but have their own agenda for doing so, for it is rumoured that at the head of the river is the City of the Dead and a great treasure.

This treasure is eventually revealed to not be material wealth, but an ancient artifact that is used to monitor the depths of space for an approaching evil.

Reception
Dave Langford reviewed Voyage to the City of the Dead for White Dwarf #84, and stated that "Alan Dean Foster [...] offers page-turning hokum as two bickering, married scientists make their way by hydrofoil up an alien river, overcoming with ease such obstacles as the theft of their boat by hostile tribes, or attacks by ravening abominable snowmen. Just to make sure, the author has an emergency deus ex machina waiting to save them from the final peril..."

Reviews
Review by Gene DeWeese (1984) in Science Fiction Review, Winter 1984
Review by Don D'Ammassa (1984) in Science Fiction Chronicle, #62 November 1984
Review by Keith Soltys (1984) in Fantasy Review, December 1984
Review by Thomas A. Easton [as by Tom Easton] (1985) in Analog Science Fiction/Science Fact, January 1985

References

External links

Alan Dean Foster homepage

1984 American novels
Humanx Commonwealth
Novels by Alan Dean Foster
1984 science fiction novels
American science fiction novels
Del Rey books